Slavery in Lithuania existed on the territory of Grand Duchy of Lithuania. It continued in various forms until late in the 16th century and was supplanted by the institution of serfdom.

History
From the 9th century, the lands of Baltic tribes was introduced into the slave supply movement. Often attacked by Vikings who were capturing slaves there, Lithuanians eventually started enslaving other nations themselves. By the end of 12th century, Lithuanians began slave hunting raids in foreign lands. Baltic tribes started attacking each other and taking slave women and children, while the men were usually killed. Often Lithuanian nobility families had young girl slaves that would work around the houses and farms. Usually girls were taken from Rus' lands and sometimes from Poland.

In the 1200s – 1210s, Lithuanians would often attack Estonian lands and take numbers of slaves back home, but most of the raids end up unsuccessfully as Lithuanian forces was often attacked by Germans and Livonians on their way back home.

Between 1277 and 1376, there were recorded 24 big raids by Lithuanians in Prussia and Polish lands, whose aim was to bring back more slaves to Lithuania. Some records show that Grand Dukes of Lithuania would sell slaves to foreign countries for the income. In 1383 Jogaila was accused of selling German slaves to Russian lands.

In 1588 the third Statute of Lithuania was signed, which finally completely abolished slavery, but still promoted serfdom (see Serfdom in Poland#15th to 18th centuries for details). Only Emancipation reform of 1861 abolished serfdom in Lithuania, with exceptions of Palanga (in 1819) and Suvalkija (in 1807) where serfdom was already abolished earlier.

Contemporary slavery 
According to the Walk Free Foundation's research done 2013 there is about 3,000 people in Lithuania suffering from contemporary slavery.

See also
Slavery in Poland
Slavery in Russia

References

Economic history of Lithuania
Legal history of Lithuania
Lithuania
History of Lithuania (1219–1569)
Slavery in Europe
Human rights abuses in Lithuania